The Governor of Central Java (Indonesian: Gubernur Jawa Tengah) is the first-level regional head in Central Java along with the Deputy Governor and 120 members of the Central Java Regional House of Representatives. The Governor and Deputy Governor of Central Java are elected through general elections which are held every 5 years. The current governor of Central Java is Ganjar Pranowo.

List of governors 
The following is a list of Governors of Central Java:

Notes

References 

Governors of Central Java